Iiro Petteri Järvi (born 23 March 1965 in Helsinki, Finland) is a retired professional ice hockey player who played in the National Hockey League and SM-Liiga. He played for HIFK, SaiPa, and Quebec Nordiques.

Career statistics

Regular season and playoffs

International

External links 

1965 births
Living people
Finnish ice hockey right wingers
Halifax Citadels players
HIFK (ice hockey) players
Ice hockey players at the 1988 Winter Olympics
Olympic ice hockey players of Finland
Olympic medalists in ice hockey
Olympic silver medalists for Finland
Quebec Nordiques draft picks
Quebec Nordiques players
SaiPa players
Ice hockey people from Helsinki